The original log section of the Moses Brown House was built about 1785, with a stone addition dating to about 1814. The house illustrates a transition in construction practice and style, with the much larger, later addition reflecting a higher level of detail and sophistication.

The Moses Brown House listed on the National Register of Historic Places in 1977.

References

External links
, including photo in 1980, at Maryland Historical Trust

Eldersburg, Maryland
Houses in Carroll County, Maryland
Houses completed in 1785
Houses on the National Register of Historic Places in Maryland
National Register of Historic Places in Carroll County, Maryland